The Vale of Towy Railway (VoTR) was a Welsh railway that provided an 11.25 mile-long extension of the Llanelly Railway from Llandeilo to Llandovery. It was incorporated by Act of Parliament of 10 July 1854 and opened on 1 April 1858.

Overview
The VoTR was a standard gauge route that provided an alternative to the Great Western Railway and Llandovery became a potential endpoint for other rail companies in North Wales and the West of England.

Stations

The route today
The route remains in use as part of the Heart of Wales Line.

References

 

Pre-grouping British railway companies
Railway companies established in 1854
Railway lines opened in 1858
British companies established in 1854
1854 establishments in Wales